The Super 8 Tournament is an annual professional wrestling tournament held by the East Coast Wrestling Association. The tournament is contested by eight female wrestlers in a one-night single-elimination format. The tournament was originally called the Chickfight tournament until ECWA was sold in 2019 where it was rebranded the Women's Super 8 Tournament.

History
The Super 8 Tournament was first held on October 11, 2014, and was won by Tessa Blanchard.

List of past winners

Past tournament results

2014
October 11, in Carney's Point, New Jersey

2015
October 17, in Woodbury Heights, New Jersey

2016
October 22, in Woodbury Heights, New Jersey

2017
October 21, in Woodbury Heights, New Jersey

2019
March 16, in Newcastle, Delaware

2021
July 31, in Paulsboro, New Jersey

References

East Coast Wrestling Association
Professional wrestling tournaments
Women's professional wrestling tournaments